Marc A. Coppola (born June 16, 1968) is a resident of the Town of Tonawanda, New York and a former member of the New York State Senate, where he represented the New York State Senate's 60th district, which included parts of the Cities of Buffalo and Tonawanda, the City of Niagara Falls and the Town of Grand Island.

Coppola graduated from Lafayette High School in Buffalo, New York. He holds a New York state real estate license and is a first class stationary engineer.

He began his political career by serving six years as the Delaware District Councilmember for the City of Buffalo. From 2004 to 2006 he was the Majority Leader of the Common Council. He succeeded his cousin, Al Coppola, in the Council seat.

In a February 2006 special election for the State Senate's 60th District, the Democratic Committees in Erie and Niagara Counties selected Coppola as their nominee over Buffalo Councilman Antoine Thompson. Coppola resigned the Council seat after being elected to the 60th District Senate seat.

While in the State Senate, Coppola served as the Ranking Minority Member of the Senate Cities Committee. This committee oversees legislation and policies relating to urban development and New York State's 62 cities. He also served on the Aging Committee, Commerce, Economic Development and Small Business Committee, Higher Education Committee, Labor Committee, and Tourism, Recreation and Sports Development Committee.

Thompson subsequently challenged and defeated Coppola in the September 2006 primary for a full two-year term in the Senate. At the urging of Mayor Byron Brown and Thompson, former State Sen. Al Coppola also challenged for the seat in the 2006 primary. Thompson defeated Marc Coppola again in the 2006 general election where Coppola ran as an Independent.

Coppola also ran in the 2010 general election as a Democrat, against Republican candidate Mike Ranzenhofer, for the New York 61st Senate District, obtaining about 37% of the votes.

Election results
 February 2006 special election, NYS Senate, 60th SD
{| class="Wikitable"
| Marc A. Coppola (DEM - IND) || ... || 8,251
|-
| Christopher L. Jacobs (REP - CON) || ... || 6,321
|}

 November 2006 general election, NYS Senate, 60th SD
{| class="Wikitable"
| Antoine M. Thompson (DEM - WOR) || ... || 37,623
|-
| Marc A. Coppola (IND) || ... || 14,528
|}

 November 2010 general election, NYS Senate, 61st SD
{| class="Wikitable"
| Michael H. Ranzenhofer (REP - IND - CON) || ... || 63,467
|-
| Marc A. Coppola (DEM) || ... || 37,464
|}

References

1960s births
Living people
American people of Italian descent
Democratic Party New York (state) state senators
Politicians from Buffalo, New York